Nicolaas Moerloos (10 August 1900 – 5 September 1944) was a Belgian gymnast and weightlifter who competed in the 1920 Summer Olympics and in the 1924 Summer Olympics. He was born in Sint-Niklaas and died in Belsele. In 1920 he won the silver medal as member of the Belgian gymnastics team in the European system event. Four years later he finished twelfth in the featherweight weightlifting competition at the 1924 Games.

He was killed during World War II, as a resistant in an encounter with Germans towards the end of the war.

References

External links
profile

1900 births
1944 deaths
Belgian male artistic gymnasts
Olympic gymnasts of Belgium
Olympic weightlifters of Belgium
Gymnasts at the 1920 Summer Olympics
Weightlifters at the 1924 Summer Olympics
Olympic silver medalists for Belgium
Olympic medalists in gymnastics
Belgian male weightlifters
Medalists at the 1920 Summer Olympics
Sportspeople from Sint-Niklaas
Resistance members killed by Nazi Germany
Belgian resistance members
Belgian civilians killed in World War II